Pingtung Baseball Field is a multi-use stadium in Pingtung City, Pingtung County, Taiwan. Currently, it is mostly used for baseball; however, local cricket players have been using the field as a makeshift pitch for several years. It was opened in 1981 and can hold up to 10,000 people.

See also
 List of stadiums in Taiwan
 Sport in Taiwan

References

1981 establishments in Taiwan
Baseball venues in Taiwan
Buildings and structures in Pingtung County